is a Japanese baseball pitcher for the Hiroshima Toyo Carp of Nippon Professional Baseball.

After playing in the USA vs. Japan Collegiate All-Star Series, Ugusa was selected by the Hiroshima Toyo Carp in the 2019 Nippon Professional Baseball draft as the team's second pick. Ugusa split the 2020 season between the Carp and their Western League affiliate. In his second professional season, Ugusa again spent time in the NPB and Western League.

References

1997 births
Living people
Nippon Professional Baseball outfielders
Hiroshima Toyo Carp players
Baseball people from Tokyo
People from Sumida